Jan Petter Lindvall (born March 18, 1950 in Kåfjord) is a Norwegian retired cross-country skier who competed from 1982 to 1984. He finished fifth in the 50 km event at the 1984 Winter Olympics in Sarajevo.

Lindvall finished 11th in the 50 km event at the 1982 FIS Nordic World Ski Championships in Oslo. His only World Cup victory was in a 50 km event in the Soviet Union in 1983.

Cross-country skiing results
All results are sourced from the International Ski Federation (FIS).

Olympic Games

World Championships

World Cup

Season standings

Individual podiums
1 victory 
4 podiums

References

External links

Profile at Sports-Reference.com

1950 births
Living people
Cross-country skiers at the 1984 Winter Olympics
Norwegian male cross-country skiers
Olympic cross-country skiers of Norway
People from Gáivuotna–Kåfjord
Sportspeople from Troms og Finnmark